Academia San José High School was a Christian school, located in Villa Caparra, Puerto Rico. The school was officially shut down in May 2021 after years of financial issues.

Elementary school
The Academia San José Elemental was also part of the Academia San José, and also a Catholic school, in Villa Caparra, Puerto Rico. The Elementary School offered many activities for its students.

High school 
The Academia San Jose High School was the first of the two schools built. It offered a wide variety of electives, courses, AP courses, activities, and more.

References

External links
 

Catholic secondary schools in Puerto Rico